Sharon Kay Metz was a former member of the Wisconsin State Assembly.

Biography
Metz was born on September 13, 1934 in Omro, Wisconsin. She graduated from high school in Winneconne, Wisconsin before graduating from the University of Wisconsin-Green Bay. Metz was married and had four children. Sharon Kay Metz died on June 19, 2020, in Oshkosh.

Career
Metz was elected to the Assembly in 1974. In 1986, she was a candidate for Lieutenant Governor of Wisconsin. She ran on the Democratic gubernatorial ticket with incumbent Tony Earl. They lost to the Republican ticket made up of future United States Secretary of Health and Human Services Tommy Thompson and future Governor of Wisconsin Scott McCallum.

References

People from Omro, Wisconsin
Democratic Party members of the Wisconsin State Assembly
Women state legislators in Wisconsin
University of Wisconsin–Green Bay alumni
1934 births
2020 deaths
21st-century American women